Rouven Kai Sattelmaier (born 7 August 1987) is a German former professional footballer who played as goalkeeper.

Career 
Born in Ludwigsburg, Sattelmaier began his career 1997 in the youth team of TSV Affalterbach and was scouted in 2000 by VfB Stuttgart. After only one year for VfB Stuttgart's youth team he was sold to SGV Freiberg. He played two years for Freiberg and joined Stuttgarter Kickers in 2003. In season 2004–05 he won with the Stuttgarter Kickers the South German Championship and moved to Jahn Regensburg where he played his first season in the U-19 team. In winter 2006, Sattelmaier was promoted to the reserve team and earned his first two caps on professional stage in the Oberliga Bayern for Jahn Regensburg. In November 2008 he was called up to the 3. Liga team, due to an injury of goalkeeper Bastian Becker. In 2010, he signed a two-year contract with the German record champions Bayern Munich as keeper for their second team and third choice for the first-team, sharing both roles with Maximilian Riedmüller. He left Bayern after two years.

After his contract expired at Bayern he went on trial at Scottish Football League Third Division side Rangers. After six months without a club, Sattelmaier signed for 1. FC Heidenheim in January 2013.

In July 2016, he signed for English League One side Bradford City on a one-year contract. He was released by Bradford City at the end of the 2017–18 season.

On 13 August 2018, Sattelmaier joined Darmstadt 98 on a one-year deal.

Coaching career
Sattelmaier retired at the end of the 2018–19 season and on 17 July 2019 SG Sonnenhof Großaspach announced, that they had hired him as a goalkeeper coach.

Career statistics

Honours 
 Jahn Regensburg player of the season 2008–09

References

External links 
  
 
 

1987 births
Living people
People from Ludwigsburg
Sportspeople from Stuttgart (region)
Footballers from Baden-Württemberg
German footballers
Association football goalkeepers
2. Bundesliga players
3. Liga players
VfB Stuttgart players
Stuttgarter Kickers players
SSV Jahn Regensburg II players
SSV Jahn Regensburg players
FC Bayern Munich footballers
FC Bayern Munich II players
1. FC Heidenheim players
Bradford City A.F.C. players
SV Darmstadt 98 players
English Football League players
German expatriate footballers
German expatriate sportspeople in England
Expatriate footballers in England